Dioscorea polystachya or Chinese yam, also called cinnamon-vine, is a species of flowering plant in the yam family. It is sometimes called Chinese potato or by its Korean name ma. It is also called huaishan in Chinese and waisan in Cantonese.

It is a perennial climbing vine, native to East Asia. The edible tubers  are cultivated largely in Asia and sometimes used in alternative medicine. This species of yam is unique as the tubers can be eaten raw.

Range 
This plant grows throughout East Asia. It is believed to have been introduced to Japan in the 17th century or earlier. Introduced to the United States as early as the 19th century for culinary and cultural uses, it is now considered an invasive plant species. The plant was introduced to Europe in the 19th century during the European Potato Failure, where cultivation continues to this day for the Asian food market.

Taxonomy 

The botanical names Dioscorea opposita and Dioscorea oppositifolia have been consistently misapplied to Chinese yam. The name D. opposita is now an accepted synonym of D. oppositifolia.  Botanical works that point out the error may list, e.g., Dioscorea opposita auct. as a synonym of D. polystachya. Furthermore, neither D. oppositifolia nor the prior D. opposita have been found growing in North America and have no historical range in China or East Asia, this grouping is native only to the subcontinent of India and should not be confused with Dioscorea polystachya.

Description

They twine clockwise. They are lobed at the base and larger ones may have lobed edges. The arrangement is variable; they may be alternately or oppositely arranged or borne in whorls.

The bulbils are sometimes informally referred to as "yam berries" or "yamberries".

New plants sprout from the bulbils or parts of them.

The flowers of Chinese yam are cinnamon-scented.

The plant produces one or more spindle-shaped or cylindrical tubers. The largest may weigh  and grow  underground. Dioscorea polystachya is more tolerant to frost and cooler climates than other yams, which is attributed to its successful introductions and establishment on many continents.

Common names 

Rarely, it is also referred to as shǔyù . The yam bulbils are referred to as shanyao dou or shanyao dan.

In Japan, three groups of this species in cultivation are recognized. The term  is used particularly in the Kantō region for the ichōimo in the market, but this is confusing since traditionally yamatoimo has also referred to tsukuneimo, especially if produced in  Yamato Province (now Nara Prefecture). Cultivars of this species (such as yamatoimo) is sometimes called "Japanese mountain yam", though that term should properly be reserved for the native Dioscorea japonica.

In Korea it is called ma, sanu, seoyeo, or sanyak.

In Sri Lanka in Sinhala it is called wal ala. It is sometimes called Korean yam.

In Vietnam, the yam is called củ mài or khoai mài. When this yam is processed to become a medicine, the yam is called hoài sơn or tỳ giải.

In the Ilocano of the northern Philippines it is called tuge.

In Latin American countries it is known as white name or white ñame.

In Manipuri it is called as "Ha".

In alternative medicine 
Creams and dietary supplements made from the related Dioscorea villosa are claimed to contain human hormones and promoted as a medicine for a variety of purposes, including cancer prevention and the treatment of Crohn's disease and whooping cough. However, according to the American Cancer Society, the claims are false and there is no evidence to support these substances being either safe or effective. Huáishān has also been used in traditional Chinese medicine.

As an invasive species
Dioscorea polystachya was introduced to the United States in the 1800s when it was planted as an ornamental or food crop. It and other introduced yam species now grow wild there. It is troublesome in Great Smoky Mountains National Park, where its range is "rapidly expanding", particularly into the Tennessee Valley where different native, hybrid and/or invasive non-native variants of morning glory and bindweed as well as invasive kudzu and dodder have all become problematic and are similar in appearance to the fast-moving and often mishandled tubers. 

As Chinese yam and air potatoes continue to destroy entire swaths of gardens and yards though are not yet classified as invasive in these areas, residents seeking to eat the tuber plant their vines in unprotected land while residents seeking removal chop the tops off of vines at ground level and compost them or turn them into mulch for years before realizing this only makes their problem much worse and that no weed killers on the market, state recommended or otherwise do a decent job at ridding a garden or yard of this nuisance. The newest solution from Florida for people in Florida and surrounding states experiencing harm to their property and wishing a reprieve from these plant pests is to request free Air Potato Beetles. However, the beetles continue to elude Tennesseans due to various government regulations and the lack of others.  It is most prevalent in moist habitat types. It is more tolerant of frost than other yams and can occur in temperate climates as far north as New York.

Uses

The tubers of D. polystachya can be eaten raw (grated or sliced), while most other yams must be cooked before consumption (due to harmful substances in the raw state).

First the skin needs to be removed by peeling (or by scraping off using a hard-bristled brush). This may cause a slight irritation to the hand, and wearing a latex glove is advised, but if an itch develops then lemon juice or vinegar may be applied.

The peeled whole tubers are briefly soaked in a vinegar-water solution, to neutralize irritant oxalate crystals found in their skin, and to prevent discoloration. The raw vegetable is starchy and bland, mucilaginous when cut or grated, and may be eaten plain as a side dish, or added to noodles, etc.

Japanese cuisine 

In Japanese cuisine, both the Chinese yam cultivars and the Japanese yam (often wild foraged) are used interchangeably in dishes. The difference is that the nagaimo tends to be more watery, while the native Japanese yam is more viscous.

The  is the mucilaginous purée made by grating varieties the Chinese yam (nagaimo, ichōimo, tsukuneimo) or the native Japanese yam. The classic Japanese culinary technique is to grate the yam by grinding it against the rough grooved surface of a suribachi, which is an earthenware mortar. Or the yam is first grated crudely using an oroshigane grater, and subsequently worked into a smoother paste in the suribachi using a wooden pestle.

The tororo poured over raw tuna (maguro) sliced into cubes is called yamakake, and eaten with soy sauce and wasabi.

The tororo may also be  poured over noodles to make tororo udon/soba. Noodles with grated yam over it is also called yamakake.

Grated yam is also used as binding agent in the batter of okonomiyaki.

Sometimes the grated yam is used as an additive for making the skin of the manjū confection, in which case the product is called . The yam is also used in the making a regional confection called karukan, a specialty of the Kyūshū region.

Chinese cuisine 

Chinese yam is referred to as shānyào in Chinese and the tuber is consumed raw, steamed or deep-fried. It is added to savory soups, or can be sweetened with a berry sauce.

Korean cuisine 
In Korea, there are two main types of Chinese yam: The straight, tube-shaped variant is called jangma, while danma refers to the variant, which grows shorter, cluster-like tubes. Both are used in cooking and the tubers are prepared in a variety of ways. They are most commonly consumed raw, after the skinned roots have been blended with water, milk or yogurt (occasionally with additional honey) to create a nourishing drink known as majeup or "ma juice". Alternatively, the peeled tubers are cut into pieces and served—either raw, after cooking, steaming or frying, along with seasoning sauces.

Growing Chinese yam 
The Chinese yam's growing cycle spans approximately one year, and should be planted between winter and spring. The traditional methods growing it are: using smaller tubers, top cut of bigger tubers or through cuttings of branches. The first two methods can produce 20 cm (7.8 in) long tubers and above. The latter produces smaller tubers (10 cm or 4 in) that are usually replanted for the next year.

Between 7 and 9 months of replanting Chinese yam tubers, their leaves start to get dry (a common fact in plants that grow tubers), which indicates that the tubers are ready for harvest. In home gardens generally only what will be consumed is harvested, with the rest left in the pot in moist soil.

See also 
 Yam (vegetable)
 Dioscorea oppositifolia
 Dioscorea villosa
 Diosgenin
 List of ineffective cancer treatments
 Tremella fuciformis

References
Citations

Bibliography

External links

 Walck, J. L., et al. (2010). Understanding the germination of bulbils from an ecological perspective: a case study on Chinese yam (Dioscorea polystachya). Ann Bot 106 (6): 945–955. 
 Plants for a Future. Dioscorea batatas
 
 Center for Invasive Species and Ecosystem Health, Chinese yam Dioscorea polystachya Turcz.

Root vegetables
Yams (vegetable)
Dioscorea
Flora of Eastern Asia
Flora of China
Tropical agriculture
Plants described in 1837
Edible plants
Taxa named by Nikolai Turczaninow